Tonton Macoute was a special operations unit of the Haitian paramilitary force created in 1959

Tonton Macoute may also refer to:

 Ton-Ton Macoute!, a 1970 album by American artist Johnny Jenkins
 Ton-Ton Macoute, a Haitian mythological phrase meaning "bogey man" (literally: "Uncle Bagman")
 "Tonton Macoutes", a track on Coup d'etat (Muslimgauze album) (1987)
 British progressive jazz-rock band Tonton Macoute, and their 1971 album Tonton Macoute

See also
Tonton (disambiguation)